Geyuan is a town in Hengfeng County, Shangrao municipality, Jiangxi, China. , it has one residential community and 8 villages under its administration.

The speciality products are edible oil, tea, kudzu tea and kudzu powder.

History

Imperial
The meaning of the town's name is the headstream (yuan) of kudzu (ge).

As the Sui Dynasty ended and Tang Dynasty began, families with the surname of Su and Feng settled here at the source of a stream where kudzu flourished.

In the year 3 of Tang Zhenguan (629 CE), a family surnamed Zheng moved here. Then came the families Cai, Ye, Luo and Jin.

Revolutionary
In December 1927, a rebellion against the Jiangxi governor was waged. In February 1931, the committee in charge of the Northeast Jiangxi Revolutionary Base Area under Fang Zhimin moved from Yiyang county to Hengfeng, setting up the Soviet government of the Special Administration Region of northeast Jiangxi in Geyuan town. In November 1931, at Ruijin the Chinese Soviet Republic was declared a sovereign state; and Geyuan was named the capital of one of its constituent parts, i.e. the Northeastern Jiangxi Soviet. In December of the following year, the Soviet territory officially expanded into counties in Zhejiang and Fujian.

In November 1934, Geyuan was occupied by Chinese government forces.

References

Township-level divisions of Jiangxi
Hengfeng County